Shillingford may refer to:

Places

England 
Shillingford, a village near Wallingford in Oxfordshire
Shillingford, a historic name of the village of Shellingford near Faringdon in Oxfordshire
Shillingford, Devon, a village near Bampton
Shillingford St. George, a village near Exeter in Devon
Shillingford Abbot, another village south of Exeter

People 
Gloria Shillingford, Dominican educator and Labour politician
Grayson Shillingford (1944–2009), West Indian cricketer
Jake Shillingford, British singer/songwriter
John Shillingford (died 1458), politician
John Parsons Shillingford (1914–1999), English physician
Irvine Shillingford (born 1944), West Indian cricketer
Roger Shillingford, politician
Shane Shillingford (born 1983), West Indian cricketer